Fyodorovka is a village and the administrative center of the Fyodorov District of Kostanay Region in northern Kazakhstan.

References 

Populated places in Kostanay Region